Intravenous marijuana syndrome is a distinct short-term clinical syndrome related to the intravenous injection of boiled cannabis broth, which had been filtered through a cotton cloth. The syndrome has at least 25 known cases in the English language literature, but all of them prior to 1983.

It is postulated that contamination, perhaps from the cotton used to strain the liquid of the broth or from particulate plant matter getting through the straining method, could be cause for the cases of illnesses. Recently it has also been proposed that anaphylactic reactions to compounds found in the cannabis broth might contribute to the reported cases of illness.

The common side effects of intravenous marijuana syndrome include fever, myalgia, nausea and vomiting.

See also

Cotton fever

References

Cannabis abuse
Cannabis and health
Syndromes